Area codes 587, 825, and 368 are telephone area codes in the North American Numbering Plan (NANP) for the entire Canadian province of Alberta. They form an overlay with both of the previously existing area code 403 of southern Alberta, and northern Alberta's 780. Telephone numbers in area code 587 were allocated starting in late 2008. The complex overlay involving a total of five area codes in Alberta mandated ten-digit dialing throughout Alberta.

History
Prior to 1997, numbering plan area 403 comprised Alberta, Yukon and the Northwest Territories, as well as a very small western portion of what is today Nunavut (which split off from the Northwest Territories on 1 April 1999). In 1997, area code 403 began serving exclusively Alberta, with all other portions of 403 (as well as the portion of area code 819 that had served the region that is today's Nunavut but at the was still part of the Northwest Territories) splitting off into a new area code 867. In January 1999, the northern two thirds of Alberta, including Edmonton, split off as 780, leaving 403 to serve Calgary and southern Alberta. The projected exhaust date for area codes 403 and 780 was March and October 2009, respectively. In 1997, two area codes, 587 and 825, were reserved for Alberta's use by Bellcore.

The first of the new area codes, 587, entered service on September 19, 2008 as an overlay for the entire province. As a preliminary step, optional ten-digit dialling was introduced across the province on June 23 and became mandatory on September 12. On September 20, Telus Mobility began allocating numbers starting with area code 587 in the Calgary area. The alternative, splitting 403 or 780, would have resulted in portions of Alberta having to change telephone numbers for the second time in a decade. A similar step had been taken a year earlier in British Columbia, when area code 778 was converted into a province-wide overlay.

On April 9, 2016, the province was overlaid with an additional area code, 825.

As of January 21, 2022, the province has been overlaid with yet another area code, 368.

Service area and central office codes
Airdrie (587)-236 254 360 600 602 651 775 852
Banff (587)-222 653 720 883 907
Blackfalds (587)-621
Bonnyville (587)-201 398 721 792
Brooks (587)-263 270 613 994
Calgary (587)-215 216 223 224 225 226 227 228 229 230 231 232 233 274 284 291 293 296 315 316 327 328 329 330 331 332 333 349 350 351 352 353 354 355 356 358 387 390 391 392 393 403 430 432 433 434 435 436 437 438 439 441 443 445 451 470 471 472 475 476 480 481 482 483 496 500 533 534 535 538 572 573 574 575 576 577 578 579 580 581 582 583 584 595 619 620 624 625 700 702 703 707 716 717 718 719 747 755 774 776 777 779 794 830 831 832 833 834 835 836 837 839 845 846 856 880 885 886 887 888 889 890 891 892 893 894 895 896 897 898 899 901 902 903 904 905 939 944 945 946 947 948 949 952 961 962 963 964 965 966 967 968 969 970 971 972 973 975 976 977 978 997 998 999
Calgary (825)-207 210 252 253 256 408 417 509 580 710 712 800 910 980 994 999
Canmore (587)-238 361 654 722 807
Camrose (587)-322 386 614 753 769
Castor (587)-726
Claresholm (587)-278 417
Cochrane (587)-239 362 493
Coronation (587)-219
Cowley (587)-221 592
Crowsnest Pass (587)-562 563
Czar (587) 255
Drayton Valley (587)-277 464 673
Drumheller (587)-419 795
Edmonton (587)-334 335 336 337 338 340 341 346 357 372 384 385 400 401 402 404 405 407 408 409 410 412 413 414 415 416 442 446 454 455 458 459 460 462 463 469 473 487 488 489 490 501 520 521 523 524 525 526 532 545 557 588 589 590 591 592 594 596 597 598 599 635 686 687 688 689 701 708 709 710 712 754 756 758 759 760 773 778 781 782 783 784 785 786 855 873 879 881 882 920 921 922 923 924 925 926 927 928 929 930 931 936 937 938 982 983 984 985 986 987 988 989 990 991
Edmonton (825)-461 
Fort McMurray (587)-241 258 275 276 450 452 477 536 537 539 543 601 604 644 645 646 674 690 723 826 884 919 941 960
Grande Prairie (587)-202 243 259 297 298 299 343 348 495 726 752 771 803
Hay Lakes (587)-593
High River (587)-208 244 363 656
Jasper (587)- 347 870
Leduc (587)-245 264 274 453 671 828 954 979
Lethbridge (587)-220 257 370 388 394 425 486 691 787 800 813 822 961
Lake Louise (587)-838
West Lloydminster (587)-217 389 399 492 692 789
Medicine Hat (587)-245 253 289 366 750 770 801 814 824
Okotoks (587)-757
Olds (587)-540 796 872
Peace River (587)-261 479 748 996
Ponoka (587)-729 850
Provost (587)-767 878
Red Deer (587)-273 377 378 447 457 679 680 693 731 797 802 815 823 854 876 877 951
Red Deer (825)-601 602
Sherwood Park (587)-235 269 456 745 827 860 957
Slave Lake (587)-266 516 618 749
Spruce Grove (587)-249 286 461 763 853 918
Stavely (587)-662 728
Strathmore (587)-251 365 658 727 848
Stony Plain (587)-250 268 980
Sundre (587)-444
St. Albert (587)-234 751 764 804 805
St. Paul (587)-614 645
Stettler (587)-282 736 799 854
Vegreville (587)-262 280 616 790 804 981
Veteran (587)-725 857
Viking (587)-256
Vulcan (587)-652 678 793 858
Wainwright (587)-281 724 791

See also
List of NANP area codes
List of Alberta area codes

References

External links
 CRTC about Area code 825
 Area Code Map of Canada

587, 825, and 368
Communications in Alberta
Telecommunications-related introductions in 2008
Telecommunications-related introductions in 2016
Telecommunications-related introductions in 2021
2008 in Alberta
2016 in Alberta
2021 in Alberta